Zeng Yaozhang (born 14 July 2004) is a Chinese footballer currently playing as a forward for Guangzhou.

Club career
Born in Guangzhou, Guangdong, Zeng played for the Evergrande Football School, studying abroad in Spain in 2017. Since joining the first-team squad of Guangzhou, he has been tipped to become one of the club's best players.

International career
Zeng has represented China at under-16 level.

Career statistics

Club
.

References

2004 births
Living people
Footballers from Guangzhou
Footballers from Guangdong
Chinese footballers
China youth international footballers
Association football forwards
Chinese Super League players
Guangzhou F.C. players